is a Japanese photographer. His photographs are held in the collections of Nihon University, the Yokohama Civic Art Gallery, and the Tokyo Metropolitan Museum of Photography.

References

Japanese photographers
1935 births
Living people
Place of birth missing (living people)